SBS Biz (formerly SBS CNBC) is a 24-hour business news channel in South Korea.

History
On August 13, 2009, SBS  took over all stocks of a sports TV channel Xports, which were shared by CJ Media (70%) and IB Sports (30%). After a partnership agreement with CNBC (owned by NBCUniversal, a subsidiary of Comcast) which taken on October 22, 2009, Xports was shut down and replaced by SBS CNBC on December 28, 2009. Most of its programme are being made in high definition. On January 1, 2021, SBS ended a partnership with CNBC and rebranded as SBS Biz.

See also
 SBS

References

External links
  

Biz
24-hour television news channels in South Korea
Korean-language television stations
Television channels and stations established in 2009
Business-related television channels